Bob Leonard (October 16, 1941 – January 9, 2016), was a Canadian professional wrestling promoter, photographer, ring announcer, and author. During his career in the professional wrestling industry he spent three decades as the perennial photographer for Stampede Wrestling.

Biography
Leonard was born in Olds, Alberta but spent most his life in Regina, Saskatchewan.

Referred to by journalist Dave Meltzer as the number one pro wrestling historian of the 70s and 80s he was a multi-tasking employee of Stampede Wrestling who worked on several aspects of the promotion in backstage roles and in many capacities on screen but was most acknowledged for his longtime work as a photographer of matches. He has been credited as having made landmark contributions toward the understanding of professional wrestling.

Awards and recognitions
Canadian Wrestling Hall of Fame
Class of 2005
Cauliflower Alley Club
 Men's Wrestling Award (2007)
High Impact Wrestling Canada
HIW Hall of Fame (Class of 2014)
Stampede Wrestling
Stampede Wrestling Hall of Fame (Class of 1995)

See also
 List of Stampede Wrestling alumni

References

Further reading
 

1941 births
2016 deaths
Canadian photographers
People from Olds, Alberta
Professional wrestling promoters
Stampede Wrestling alumni
Professional wrestling historians